The Great Northeast Athletic Conference men's basketball tournament is the annual conference basketball championship tournament for the NCAA Division III Great Northeast Athletic Conference. The tournament has been held annually since 1996. It is a single-elimination tournament and seeding is based on regular conference season records.

The winner, declared conference champion, receives the GNAC's automatic bid to the NCAA Men's Division III Basketball Championship.

Results

Championship records

Colby–Sawyer, Dean, Elms, and Regis have not yet qualified for the GNAC tournament finals
 Schools highlighted in pink are former members of the GNAC

References

NCAA Division III men's basketball conference tournaments
Basketball, Men's, Tournament
Recurring sporting events established in 1996